NGC 767 is a barred spiral galaxy located in the constellation Cetus about 241 million light years from the Milky Way. It was discovered by the American astronomer Francis Leavenworth in 1886.

See also 
 List of NGC objects (1–1000)

References

External links 
 

Barred spiral galaxies
Cetus (constellation)
767
007483